Annette Sweeney (born December 9, 1957) is an American politician who is the Iowa State Senator for the 27th District. A Republican, she has been in the Iowa Senate since 2018, when she won a special election to replace Bill Dix after Dix resigned from the Senate.

Prior to her election to the Senate, Sweeney was a member of the Iowa House of Representatives from 2009 to 2013.

Sweeney was born in Buckeye, Iowa. She went to college at Concordia University Nebraska. She taught middle school literature in Peoria, Illinois, for a short time before taking over the family farm. She married David Sweeney in 1985.

References

External links
 Iowa Republicans biography of Sweeney
 Iowa Legislature biography of Sweeney

1957 births
Living people
Women state legislators in Iowa
Republican Party members of the Iowa House of Representatives
People from Hardin County, Iowa
Concordia University Nebraska alumni
Farmers from Iowa
21st-century American politicians
21st-century American women politicians
American women farmers